Melbourne City Football Club is an Australian professional soccer club based in Bundoora, Melbourne. The club was formed in 2009 as Melbourne Heart before being renamed as Melbourne City. They became the second Victorian member admitted into the A-League Men in 2010 after Melbourne Victory.

The list encompasses the honours won by Melbourne City. The player records section itemises the club's leading goalscorers and those who have made the most appearances in first-team competitions. It also records notable achievements by Melbourne City players on the international stage, and the highest transfer fees paid and received by the club.

Melbourne City has won one A-League Men Premiership in 2020–21, one A-League Men Championship in 2021 and an Australia Cup in 2016. The club's record appearance maker is Scott Jamieson, who has currently made 154 appearances, between 2017 and the present day. Jamie Maclaren is Melbourne City's record goalscorer, scoring 95 goals in total.

All figures are correct as of the match played on 19 March 2023.

Honours and achievements

Domestic
 A-League Men Premiership
Winners (2): 2020–21, 2021–22
Runners-up (1): 2019–20

 A-League Men Championship
Winners (1): 2021
Runners-up (2): 2020, 2022

 Australia Cup
Winners (1): 2016
Runners-up (1): 2019

Player records

Appearances
 Most A-League Men appearances: Scott Jamieson, 133
 Most Australia Cup appearances: Scott Jamieson, 15
 Youngest first-team player: Idrus Abdulahi, 15 years, 216 days (against Central Coast Mariners, A-League, 26 April 2019)
 Oldest first-team player: Thomas Sørensen, 40 years, 285 days (against Western Sydney Wanderers, A-League, 24 March 2017)
 Most consecutive appearances: Bruno Fornaroli, 55 (from 26 August 2015 to 4 February 2017)

Most appearances
Competitive matches only, includes appearances as substitute. Numbers in brackets indicate goals scored.

Goalscorers
 Most goals in a season: Jamie Maclaren, 29 goals (in the 2019–20 season)
 Most A-League Men goals in a season: Jamie Maclaren, 25 goals in the A-League, 2020–21
 Youngest goalscorer: Denis Genreau, 18 years, 100 days (against Hakoah Sydney City East, FFA Cup Round of 16, 29 August 2017)
 Oldest goalscorer: Tim Cahill, 37 years, 131 days (against Perth Glory, A-League, 16 April 2017)

Top goalscorers
Competitive matches only. Numbers in brackets indicate appearances made.

International

This section refers to caps won while a Melbourne City player.

 First capped player: Michael Beauchamp for Australia against New Zealand on 24 May 2010.
 Most capped player: Aaron Mooy with 13 caps.
 First player to play in the World Cup finals: Daniel Arzani, for Australia against France on 16 June 2018

Managerial records

 First full-time manager: John van 't Schip managed Melbourne City from October 2009 to April 2012
 Longest-serving manager: John van 't Schip,  (30 December 2013 to 3 January 2017)
 Shortest tenure as manager: Michael Valkanis, 5 months, 17 days (4 January 2017 to 19 June 2017)
 Highest win percentage: Patrick Kisnorbo, 58.11%
 Lowest win percentage: John Aloisi, 20.51%

Club records

Matches

Firsts
 First match: Whittlesea Zebras 1–5 Melbourne Heart, friendly, 28 April 2010
 First A-League Men match: Melbourne Heart 0–1 Central Coast Mariners, 5 August 2010
 First Australia Cup match: Melbourne City 1–3 Sydney FC, Round of 32, 12 August 2014
 First Asian match: BG Pathum United 1–1 Melbourne City, AFC Champions League group stage, 15 April 2022

Record wins
 Record A-League Men win: 7–0 against Melbourne Victory, 17 April 2021
 Record Australia Cup win: 5–0 against Heidelberg United, Quarter-final, 29 September 2015
 Record Asian win: 
 3–0 against United City, AFC Champions League group stage, 18 April 2022
 3–0 against United City, AFC Champions League group stage, 1 May 2022

Record defeats
 Record A-League Men defeat:
 0–4 against Brisbane Roar, 25 September 2010
 1–5 against Wellington Phoenix, 30 November 2014
 0–4 against Sydney FC, 10 February 2018
 Record Australia Cup defeat: 0–4 against Adelaide United, Final, 23 October 2019

Record consecutive results
 Record consecutive wins: 6, from 23 February 2021 to 26 March 2021
 Record consecutive defeats: 5
 from 3 March 2013 to 30 March 2013
 from 27 October 2013 to 24 November 2013
 Record consecutive matches without a defeat: 11, from 18 February 2022 to 6 April 2022
 Record consecutive matches without a win: 19, from 3 March 2013 to 10 January 2014
 Record consecutive matches without scoring a goal: 5, from 19 November 2010 to 8 December 2010

Goals
 Most A-League Men goals scored in a season: 63 in 27 matches, 2015–16
 Fewest A-League Men goals scored in a season: 31 in 27 matches, 2012–13
 Most A-League Men goals conceded in a season: 44 in 27 matches, 2015–16
 Fewest A-League Men goals conceded in a season: 32
 in 27 matches, 2018–19
 in 26 matches, 2020–21

Points
 Most A-League Men points in a season: 49 in 26 matches, 2020–21
 Fewest A-League Men points in a season: 26 in 27 matches, 2013–14

Attendances
 Highest attendance at AAMI Park, 26,579 against Melbourne Victory, A-League, 23 December 2011
 Lowest attendance at AAMI Park, 1,800 against Western Sydney Wanderers, FFA Cup quarter-finals, 19 September 2018

See also
 List of Melbourne City FC seasons

References

External links

 Melbourne City FC – Official Website

Melbourne City
Records and statistics
Melbourne sport-related lists